George Robert Stephenson (born 19 November 1942) is a former English cricketer and footballer.

He played first-class cricket for Derbyshire and Hampshire between 1967 and 1980. He also played football as an inside forward in the 1960s, notably with Rochdale.

Stephenson was born in  Derby. He was a right-handed batsman and wicket-keeper, who played first-class cricket for Derbyshire between 1967 and 1968. He joined Hampshire for the 1969 season.

Hampshire played steadily during 1969, finishing the season in fifth place, though the team found the following season hard-going and ended 1970 with just four victories under their belt.

Stephenson continued to serve Hampshire through the inconsistent times of the mid-70s, the highlight being the team's second-ever victory in the County Championship in 1973. Stephenson remained a first-team choice through the late 1970s, and into the 1980 season, but he retired from first-class cricket after Hampshire's bottom-placed finish in that season's County Championship. Stephenson's sole first-class century came for Hampshire against Somerset in 1976. He was club captain during his penultimate season following the retirement of Richard Gilliat.

Stephenson was also a professional footballer, playing for Derby County, Shrewsbury Town and Rochdale in the 1960s.

See also
List of English cricket and football players

References

External links
Bob Stephenson on CricketArchive

1942 births
Living people
English cricketers
Derbyshire cricketers
Hampshire cricketers
Hampshire cricket captains
English footballers
Association football inside forwards
English Football League players
Derby County F.C. players
Shrewsbury Town F.C. players
Rochdale A.F.C. players
Leamington F.C. players
Footballers from Derby
Cricketers from Derby
Wicket-keepers